An apprentice is someone who is in training for a trade, profession or in the context of the British abolition of slavery an obligatory status whereby the former slave was forced to labour for three quarters of the time for their former owner.

The Apprentice or Apprentice may refer to:

Television
The Apprentice, a global reality TV series franchise including a list of local, regional and global titles in the franchise
"The Apprentice", an episode of the series The Paper Chase
"The Apprentice" (Xiaolin Showdown), an episode of the animated series Xiaolin Showdown
"The Apprentice" (The Mighty B! episode), an episode of the animated children's series The Mighty B!
 "The Apprentice" (Once Upon a Time), an episode of the series Once Upon a Time

Films
 The Apprentice (1971 film) or Fleur bleue, a Quebec-made film starring Susan Sarandon
 The Apprentice (1991 film), a animated short by Richard Condie
 Apprentice (film), a 2016 Singaporean drama
 The Apprentices, a 1995 French comedy film directed by Pierre Salvadori
 "The Apprentice", a segment of the anthology film Movie 43

Literary works
The Apprentice (play), a 1756 play by the Irish dramatist Arthur Murphy
The Apprentice (Libby novel), a 1996 novel by Scooter Libby
The Apprentice (Gerritsen novel), a 2002 novel by Tess Gerritsen
The Apprentice: My Life in the Kitchen, a book by Jacques Pépin
Apprentice Adept, a heptalogy (1980 to 1990) of fantasy and science fiction novels by Piers Anthony

Music
Apprentice (In a Musical Workshop), a 1974 album by Dave Loggins
The Apprentice (album), a 1990 album by John Martyn
"The Apprentice", a song by Australian comedian Kevin Bloody Wilson
"The Apprentice", a song by British virtual band Gorillaz

Other uses
Apprentice (video game), a series of amateur adventure games
Apprentice (software), a program that facilitates the play of Magic: The Gathering online, with database capabilities
 Starkiller, a character in Star Wars: The Force Unleashed known in-universe as "The Apprentice"
The Apprentice (video game), a 1994 game for the Philips CD-i

See also
 Apprenticeship
 Young Apprentice, a British reality television programme, a spin off of The Apprentice